William Hutchison (c.1870 – 1 May 1924) was a Glasgow solicitor who served as a Unionist Member of Parliament for Glasgow Kelvingrove from 1922 until his death.

He had previously contested the Glasgow Bridgeton constituency as a Conservative.

References

External links 
 

1870 births
1924 deaths
Members of the Parliament of the United Kingdom for Glasgow constituencies
UK MPs 1922–1923
UK MPs 1923–1924
Unionist Party (Scotland) MPs